Gavdari-ye Hajj Reza Nasirian (also Romanized as Gāvdārī-ye Ḩājj Rez̤ā Naṣīrīān) is a village in Shamsabad Rural District, in the Central District of Dezful County, Khuzestan Province, Iran. At the 2006 census, its population was 91 people, separated into 14 families.

References 

Populated places in Dezful County